Tony Andruzzi (born May 22, 1925 in Cheyenne, Wyoming – died December 22, 1991 in Chicago, Illinois) was the name adopted by professional magician Tom S. Palmer from the age of 45 to the end of his life.

Changing Names

Born to Fay and Tom McGuire, the child was first christened as Timothy McGuire on July 22, 1925. But after Tom McGuire left Fay to raise the boy alone, Fay allowed Charles and Gertie Palmer to adopt the boy. He was rechristened Tom Stewart Palmer on March 29, 1926. His biological mother maintained a friendly relationship with the Palmer family, though did not divulge the nature of her relationship to Tom until his teens.

As a performer through the late 1960s, he retained the name of Tom Palmer while specializing in comedy magic. When he moved to Chicago, Illinois and changed styles to pursue bizarre magic, he adopted the name Tony Andruzzi, both in performance and in daily life. During his involvement with the Society for Creative Anachronism in the late 1960s through the mid-1970s, he also created the persona of Masklyn ye Mage, a character he would occasionally adopt in and out of period costume through the end of his life. Additionally, as a writer of magical effects, he used a variety of pen names, most notably Daemon Ecks.

Publications

As Tom Palmer:
 Cagey Doves (Chicago: Magic Inc., 1969)
 The Comedy Act of and by Tom Palmer (Chicago: Magic Inc., 1969)
 The Famous Flea Act (Chicago: Magic Inc., 1962)
 Modern Illusions (Chicago: Magic Inc., 1959)
 The Tie Pitch (Chicago: Magic Inc., 1960)
 The Vampira Act (Chicago: Magic Inc., 1961)

As Tony Andruzzi:
 Compleat Invocation, Volumes 1 and 2 (co-edited with Tony Raven) (Washington, D.C.: Kaufman and Company, 1986)
 Compleat Invocation, Volume 3 (Washington, D.C.: Kaufman and Company, 1992)
 Tony Andruzzi's Magazine Memory Act (Albuquerque: Flora and Company)

As Masklyn ye Mage:
 The Negromicon of Masklyn ye Mage (Chicago: Self Published, 1977)
 Grimoire of the Mages (Chicago: Self Published, 1980)
 Daemon's Diary (Chicago: Self Published, 1982)
 The Legendary Scroll of Masklyn ye Mage (Chicago: Self Published, 1983)

Conventions

As an outgrowth of his editorship of New Invocation, a periodical for performers of bizarre magic, Andruzzi organized and presented conventions for magicians supportive of this genre. Called Invocationals, they were held annually in Chicago from 1984 to 1990. Each Invocational revolved around performances, educational seminars, and socializing, while also paying tribute to a specific member of the bizarre-magic community. Honorees included:
 Charles Cameron (1984)
 T.A. Waters (1985)
 Max Maven (1986)
 Stephen Minch (1987)
 Ross Johnson (1988)
 Tony "Doc" Shiels (1989)
 Eugene Burger (1990)

Sources

Unspeakable Acts: Three Lives and Countless Legends of Tom Palmer/Tony Andruzzi/Masklyn ye Mage. Jim Magus with Terry Nosek and Neil Tobin (Lulu.com, 2011).

External links
 A Tony Andruzzi Memorial bearing misinformation supplied by Andruzzi and published by Bart Whaley in Who's Who in Magic (San Francisco: Jeff Busby Magic, 1990)

1925 births
1991 deaths
American magicians
People from Cheyenne, Wyoming